The Little High Rock Mountains is a mountain range in Washoe County, Nevada.

References 

Mountain ranges of Washoe County, Nevada
Mountain ranges of Nevada